Adobogiona (fl. c. 90 BC - c. 50 BC) was a Galatian princess from Anatolia.

Adobogiona bore Mithridates VI two children: a son called Mithridates of Pergamon  and a daughter called Adobogiona the Younger.

References
S. Mitchell, Anatolia: Land, Men and Gods in Asia Minor, Vol. I (1956).
A. Mayor, The Poison King: The Life and Legend of Mithradates, Rome's Deadliest Enemy, Princeton: Princeton University Press, 2009, 
Ton Derks/Nico Roymans, Ethnic Constructs in Antiquity: The Role of Power and Tradition, Amsterdam: Amsterdam University Press, 2009, p. 137.

Galatian people
Celtic women
1st-century BC women
90s BC births
50s BC deaths
Ancient princesses